is a Taiwanese publisher of manga. It was founded in June 1991. In October 1992, the company obtained the Chinese license for Akita Shoten's Weekly Shōnen Champion. However, the magazine stopped publication in 1998.

Controversy

There were two major changes to the way Ever Glory categorised it's magazines. The first change implemented categorising the magazines into 25 categories instead of only separating them into two genre, Shōnen and Shōjo.  The genre description with a number was used as an indication.  This has been criticised by fans as being too complicated. The second change was using the rainbow spectrum to categorise the magazines into 7 categories.  In 2015, the latest category as 4 categories only: "Male", "Female", "BL&GL" and "Public".

It has also been criticised for being slow to translate manga up to 2 years after the original manga has been released. (Normally, publishers will translate manga within 6 months of the original manga being published)

Works
Boku wa Imōto ni Koi o Suru
Bokurano: Ours (published 6 out of 10 volumes)
Cardcaptor Sakura
Chibi Vampire (Karin)
Chichin Pui
Elfen Lied
Feel 100%
Flower of the Deep Sleep
Giant Robo: The Day the Earth Burned
Gimmick! (manga)
Grenadier (manga)
Hitohira
Ibitsu (Okada Kazuto)
Indian Summer (manga)
Katte ni Kaizō
Kyōkasho ni Nai!
Landreaall (published 4 out of 13 volumes)
Minamisawa Hisakei's Luwon (abandoned)
Rozen Maiden
Ruff Love
Sundome
Steal Moon
Super Radical Gag Family
Tenshi ja Nai
Tenshi no Hitsugi: Ave Maria (abandoned / unfinished)
Wandering Son (abandoned half-way)
Yurara

External links

Manga distributors
Publishing companies of Taiwan
Publishing companies established in 1991
Taiwanese companies established in 1991